Osei Kwaku Vincent also known as Strongman or Strongman Burner or Strong Gee is a Ghanaian rapper. He was recognized for winning the maiden edition of the Next Big Thing in GH Rap music which was a rap competition in Ghana

Education 
Strongman attended  T.I. Ahmadiyya Senior High School, Kumasi and later further his education to the tertiary level by attending University of Cape Coast.

Discography 
List of Strongman's songs.
 Big Boy
 Pilolo
 Bossu 
 Baby Girl
 Don't Try
 Wahali
 Transformer
 Immortal
 Odasini
 Nana Ama
 Still Nigga
 Crazy For You
 Ups & Down
 21st Century
 The Second Coming
 Vision
 Kings of Gods
 Monster
 Obi Pe
 Girl Kasa
 Nkokra
 Twa Wo Nan Ase
 Mmaa
 Dose
 Onoaa Na Mepe
 Paid My Dues
 My Vibe
 Mene Woaa
 Paper
 Hooks & Lines
 You Ain't Seen Nothing Yet
 Old School
 No Diss
 Whine

Achievements 
He won the Focus fm Freestyle Friday in 2010, Kfm Freestyle Saturday in 2011 and The Next Big Thing In Ghanaian Hip-hop in 2012 under MicBurnerz Music label headed by Azee Ntwene. He was the best rapper for the  Ghana Music Awards SA.

Performance 
He was among the  musicians to perform on the first day at the 2020 VGMA Awards night.

References 

Living people
Ghanaian rappers
Year of birth missing (living people)
T.I. Ahmadiyya Senior High School (Kumasi) alumni